Everything You Want is a 2005 romantic-comedy television film on ABC Family starring Shiri Appleby and Nick Zano.

Plot
Abby Morrison has lived a sheltered life. She has had an imaginary boyfriend named Sy since she was five; it was all because she never had her parents and real friends with her. However, she is an artist with a passion to paint and usually make paintings of Sy and visions what he looks like. Abby agrees to tutor her roommate's cynical cousin Quinn and finds herself attracted to him. Quinn becomes jealous that she has a boyfriend; because he doesn't know about the reality. However, Abby ignores the attraction, in order to focus on Sy. Abby's parents invite Quinn for thanksgiving day where her mother mentions Abby's imaginary friend, which makes Quinn think that she made all of it up as an obstacle for their relationship. He stopped talking and meeting with her, but he gradually became miserable. Abby also realized that she should get rid of Sy and face reality. She asks Sy to leave for good and for the very first time she joins her parents in their weird work (decorating the tombstones they made for themselves). Quinn, after seeking advice from his roommate and cousin, searches for Abby and while looking for her in a club he once took her to, he finds a portrait of himself painted by Abby and notices an image in the background of Abby at the rink. He finds her there and kisses her.

Cast
 Shiri Appleby - Abby Morrison
 Nick Zano - Quinn Andrews
 Alexandra Holden - Jessica Lindstrom
 Orlando Seale - Sy
 Will Friedle - Calvin Dillwaller
 Edie McClurg - Mary Louise Morrison
 Scott Wilkinson - George Morrison
 K. C. Clyde - Ryan Sanders

References

External links

ABC Family original films
2005 television films
2005 films
American comedy television films
2005 romantic comedy films
American romantic comedy films
Films directed by Ryan Little
2000s American films
2000s English-language films